You Must Be Joking! is a 1986 South African film. It is Leon Schuster's first hidden camera film.

Plot
In a series of short skits, Leon Schuster uses candid camera and several disguises to stitch up the general public of South Africa. Such sketches include:
The watermelon pulse test, where Leon shows that a watermelon is only ripe when it does not have a heartbeat, much to the confusion of the seller.
Cooking on the bonnet of a car, while upsetting the traffic police.
Supposedly killing a cow in a butcher's shop.

Cast
Leon Schuster
Mike Schutte
Kallie Knoetze
Golda Raff
Janine Pretorius
Martino

External links

1986 comedy films
1986 films
South African comedy films
Afrikaans-language films
English-language South African films